Sha Tin Wai is a station on the  in Sha Tin, Hong Kong. The name "Sha Tin Wai" comes from the village called Sha Tin Wai, which is located to the northeast of the station. It was provisionally called "Sha Kok Street" before the Ma On Shan line opened, because it is located at Sha Kok Street.
 
It serves residents living in Pok Hong Estate, Sha Kok Estate, Jat Min Chuen, Yue Shing Court, Shui Chuen O Estate, and also serves over 10 schools around the area, including kindergartens, primary schools and secondary schools, such as Po Leung Kuk Chee Jing Yin Primary School, The Church of Christ in China Kei Kok Primary School, Island School and Immaculate Heart of Mary College.

The pattern featured on the platform pillar and glass barrier is a shot of Tsang Tai Uk traditional walled settlement.

History 
On 21 December 2004, Sha Tin Wai station opened to the public with other KCR Ma On Shan Rail stations.

The Ma On Shan Line was renamed Tuen Ma Line Phase 1 at the time. Sha Tin Wai station became an intermediate station on this temporary new line. 

Hence, Sha Tin Wai was included in the project and is now an intermediate station on the Tuen Ma line, Hong Kong's longest railway line.

Station layout

Platforms 1 and 2 share the same island platform.

Exits
There are four exits to Sha Tin Wai station.

A: Jat Min Chuen 
B: Pok Hong Estate 
C: Sha Kok Estate 
D: Sha Tin Wai, Shui Chuen O Estate

Gallery

References

MTR stations in the New Territories
Ma On Shan line
Tuen Ma line
Sha Tin Wai
Former Kowloon–Canton Railway stations
Railway stations in Hong Kong opened in 2004